Piz Grevasalvas is a mountain of the Albula Alps, located north of Maloja in the canton of Graubünden. It lies on the range between the Julier Pass and Lake Sils.

References

External links
 Piz Grevasalvas on Hikr

Mountains of Switzerland
Mountains of Graubünden
Mountains of the Alps
Two-thousanders of Switzerland
Sils im Engadin/Segl
Bregaglia
Surses